The U-5TS (production designation 2A20) tank gun is a 115 mm-calibre weapon that was fitted exclusively to the Soviet Union's T-62 main battle tank. It was the first smoothbore weapon designed for tanks and heralded the change in main armament from rifled cannons.

History
As the T-54/55 series began to replace the T-34 tanks in the Soviet Army in the 1950s it was recognised that the standard NATO tanks of the time—the Centurion and M48 Patton—had armour that could not easily be defeated by the existing ammunition for the 100 mm D10 gun that the new tanks carried. The Soviets set about designing a new "heavy" vehicle which was required to complement the tanks in an overwatch capacity and to provide greater anti-armour capability.

The new vehicle, the T-62, was to be equipped with a new smoothbore design—which allows higher velocity and greater armour penetration with kinetic rounds—based on an enlargement of the 100 mm 2A19 anti-tank gun that had entered production in 1955. The new weapon, designated as U-5T, could penetrate 300mm of vertical RHA at 1,000 metres and re-established a comfortable penetration capacity against Western armour.

Though the T-62 would have variable success in the conflicts it was involved in, the U-5TS would remain a formidable weapon that proved capable of penetrating the armour of any comparable NATO tank until the deployment of third generation MBTs in the late 1970s and early 80s. This was proven by examination of Iranian Chieftain and M60s knocked out by Iraqi T-62s during the Iran–Iraq War. These examinations led to the development of add-on armour packages such as Stillbrew to try to counter the U-5TS.

Ammunition
Another first with this gun was the use of armour-piercing fin-stabilized discarding-sabot ammunition, with the initial 3VBM-1 rounds featuring steel penetrators. The subsequent development of this type of ammunition for this gun led to an array of penetrator designs and different materials with the final model, the 3UBM-13, using depleted uranium. In accordance with later Soviet and current Russian practice an anti-tank guided missile, the 9K118 Sheksna, has been developed for use with the T-62 and U-5TS. There is also HE-FRAG and HEAT ammunition available for this weapon.

Due to the comparatively low height of the T-62 design - in line with Soviet tank design philosophies of the time  - the U-5TS is limited to a rate-of-fire of 6-10 shots per minute due to little room for the loader to perform his activity. Experienced loaders were capable of reloading the gun in 6 seconds.

Current and former users
 
 
 
 
 
 
 
 
 
 
 
 
 
 
 
 
 
 
 
 
 
 
 
 
 
 
 Lebanese Christian Militia

See also

Weapons of comparable role, performance and era
 Royal Ordnance L11A5: British 120-mm rifled equivalent

Notes

References
 Zaloga, Steven; Modern Soviet Combat Tanks; Osprey Publishing, London; 1984

External links

 http://articles.janes.com/articles/Janes-Ammunition-Handbook/115-mm-3UBM-5-APFSDS-T-cartridge-Russian-Federation.html

Tank guns of the Soviet Union
Cold War artillery of the Soviet Union
Large-caliber cartridges